Perplexus is a 3-D ball-in-a-maze puzzle or labyrinth game enclosed in a transparent plastic sphere. By twisting and turning the sphere, players attempt to maneuver a small steel ball through an intricate maze composed of a number of steps (varying in each puzzle) along narrow plastic tracks. The number of steps ranges from 30 in the Perplexus Twist to 225 in the Perplexus 3x3 Rubik's cube Hybrid. Some of the steps involve dropping the ball into a cup or through a small rim to take advantage of its three-dimensional nature. There are obstacles of varying difficulty that must be navigated in order to reach the end.

Perplexus LLC is the manufacturer and a wholly owned subsidiary of Spin Master Ltd (since 2017).

History
Perplexus was co-invented by teacher and magician Michael McGinnis and toy inventors Brian Clemens and Dan Klitsner of San Francisco-based KID Group—known for the invention of the games Bop It, HyperDash, and other titles. McGinnis first sketched ideas for three-dimensional labyrinths in the late 1970s. Years later, he showed sketches and rough prototypes to Clemens and Klitsner (1999). After a year of collaboration and many prototypes, they perfected the toy's gameplay so that it was easy enough for a young child to start, yet challenging for any age due to its many levels.

Versions

There are currently twenty-seven versions of Perplexus: 

 Original (re-branded as Beast in 2019)
 Rookie (re-branded as Rebel in 2019)
 Epic
 Twist
 Warp
 Perplexus Giant
 World's Smallest: Twist
 World's Coolest: Teeter
 World's Coolest: Spiral
 World's Coolest: Cascading Cups
 World's Smallest: Original
 Twisted
 Q-Bot
 Death Star
 Mini Spiral
 Mini Cascading Cups
 Prophecy (recolour/rethemed Rookie/Rebel design)
 LightSpeed
 Drakko
 Go! Spiral
 Go! Stairs
 Go! Snitch
 Sidewinder
 Revolution Runner (has a motor with 4 settings and a button to start/stop the turning depending on which setting)
 Rubik's Hybrid (modeled after the 2x2 Rubik's cube)
 Rubik's Fusion (modeled after the 3x3 Rubik's cube, but only rotates on one axis)
 Portal, the newest Perplexus release

The Perplexus balls can also be colored differently, such as in the Yellow Rookie.

Superplexus

In 2001, a version of the Perplexus Ball, called Superplexus, was launched with limited availability. This version has an electronic timer.

See also
 Ball-in-a-maze puzzle
 Rubik's 360
 Rolling ball sculpture
 Rubik's Cube

References

External links
 Michael McGinnis's page about the development of Superplexus
 An article in SFGate about SuperPlexus
 A video interview with Michael McGinnis about the development of Superplexus
 Spin Master, the makers of Perplexus

Games of physical skill
Puzzles
2000s toys
Products introduced in 2000
Physical activity and dexterity toys